Enhle Mbali Mlotshwa (born 3 March 1988), is a South African actress, TV presenter and fashion designer. She is known for her breakthrough role on the South African Television Series, Tshisa. She launched the maternity wear range SE Preggoz in South Africa and New York in 2015.

Career 
Mlotshwa landed her first role on the South African series Mtunzini.com which aired on the South African National Broadcasting Corporation from 2006 - 2009. Her breakthrough role was on the South African television series, Tshisa. Mlotshwa has since been cast on numerous South African television soapies and drama series including the telenovela iNkaba, Moferefere Lenyalong, Soul City, Sokhulu and Partners, Rhythm City, Rockville, and 7de Laan.

In 2009, Mlotshwa hosted the Channel O series, Young, Gifted and Black and then went on to host ANN7’s, Starbiz which focused on local and international entertainment news. She was a speaker at the Dstv In Good Company Experience which hosted American actress and writer Issa Rae in 2018.

In 2018, she was cast as the lead actress for the short film Lace''. The film won Best Film, Audience Favourite, Best Actor, Best Writing, Best Directing, and Best Special Effects for the 48 Hour Film Project in Johannesburg. The film went on to compete at Filmapalooza 2019 in Orlando, Florida earning Mlotshwa an international Best Actress Award.

In 2019, Mlotshwa was cast as supporting lead for the series The Herd.

Filmography

Business and ventures

Fashion Line 
Mlotshwa launched the maternity wear range SE Preggoz in South Africa and New York in 2015.

Philanthropy 
In 2018, Mlotshwa launched the Enhle Cares Foundation at the inaugural Forever Young Gala Dinner alongside The House of Mandela Family Foundation and Africa Rising, supported by Global Citizen.

The Enhle Cares Foundation is a multi-faceted organization targeting girls and young women in disadvantaged communities. The goal is to identity gaps in service provision and through collaborative works, offer solutions to specific issues. To date, there has been a drive to provide respite activities for girls in South Africa who are primary caregivers for their family members affected by HIV/ AIDS, disability or old age. The foundation also has a strong focus on addressing sexism in South Africa

Personal life
Enhle Mbali Mlotshwa married South African DJ Black Coffee (real name Nkosinathi Innocent Maphumulo) in 2011. In July 2019, they separated and began divorce proceedings.

References

External links
 
 

South African fashion designers
South African television actresses
Living people
21st-century South African actresses
1988 births
South African women fashion designers
South African television presenters
South African women television presenters